The 2010–11 Championnat National de football Amateur was the first season in the Algerian league system under its current division title and format. This was due to the professionalisation of the first two divisions. A total of 28 teams contested the division. The division had two groups. The two groups contained 14 clubs each from their respective regions, which were either central west or central east of the country. The league began on September 24, 2010.

Team overview

Stadia and locations

Groupe Est

Groupe Ouest

League table

Groupe Centre-Est

Groupe Centre-Ouest

References

Ligue Nationale du Football Amateur seasons
3
Algeria